Primavalle is the 27th  of Rome, identified by the initials Q. XXVII. It is part of the Municipio XIV.

History
Thanks to several archaeological discoveries, the first settlements in the area can be dated back to 1st century BC: a structure of that period, that was part of a thermal bath, was found between Via Pietro Bembo and Via Pietro Gasparri, in the little valley where the Fosso della Favara used to flow; and in 1912 a big dolium was discovered during the broadening of Via della Pineta Sacchetti. In the area where is now located the Agostino Gemelli University Policlinic a villa or a farm should have existed, as during the refurbishment of an adjoining plot of land tufa and travertine blocks have been found. After the fall of the Roman Empire, the area was used for cultivation and was largely uninhabited, forming part of the vast Agro Romano, with scattered huts and buildings.

In the Middle Age, the area was comprised within the vast estate called Casalia or Casalia Turris Vetulae (in Latin, Farmhouses or Farmhouses of the Old Tower), a large property owned by St. Peter's Basilica that included a number of adjacent neighborhoods, like Mimmoli, Sant'Agata, Palmarola, Mazzalupo, Sant'Andrea, Casal del Marmo and Pedica della Marinetta. Starting from 1505, the Vatican Chapter divided the estate in 8 minor plots, amongst which the Tenuta di Torrevecchia and the Tenuta di Primavalle.

While the toponym Torrevecchia can be dated back to 1390, the name Primavalle appears for the first time in a map intended for hunters, drawn in 1547 by Eufrosino Della Volpaia.

Following to the 1867 laws on the liquidation of the ecclesiastical assets, the Vatican Chapter alienated the Tenuta di Torrevecchia in 1875 and later, to avoid expropriations, quickly ceded the Tenuta di Primavalle. The area, that at the time was uninhabited and was used for military drills, was acquired in 1923 by ALBA, a construction company that began to build little houses, mixed with gardens and rural buildings, all surrounded by the green of the near Pineta Sacchetti (a large pinewood owned by the noble Sacchetti family). Alongside the main road, Via di Primavalle (corresponding to the present-day Via Pio IX and Via Cardinal Garampi), a large square had been built, Piazza di Primavalle, which was dedicated to Pope Pius IX in 1956.

In the same years, restoring and readjusting an old abandoned farmhouse, the nuns of the Congregation of the Poor Daughters of San Giuseppe Calasanzio established the Oasi di Primavalle, a social facility addressed to orphans and inmates' children, that later became a school. Later, other religious congregations established institutes in the borough, especially the Congregation of the Ursulines of the Agonizing Heart of Jesus and the Poor Servants of Divine Providence: the latter is in charge of the church of Santa Maria Assunta e San Giuseppe in Primavalle.

When, during the fascist period, several new suburbs (the so-called borgate) were planned to house the population that was moving from the center of Rome after the demolitions provided by the 1931 city plan, a borgata was built near the Pineta Sacchetti, taking advantage of the preexisting roads and buildings. Primavalle was intended to host about 5,000 people coming from the areas where Via della Conciliazione and Via dei Fori Imperiali had been built. The construction of the new settlement began in 1936 by the Istituto Fascista Case Popolari (IFCP, Fascist Institute for Public Housing), while the municipality built a public dormitory. The first buildings were flanked by the huts and poor houses built by the laborers who already lived there. The area was, however, particularly poor and still after the Second World War the social services were scarce.

The borgata was inaugurated in 1939, developing along the route of Via della Borgata di Primavalle (the current Via Federico Borromeo), with the linear structure typical of the Fascist architecture. The borough was completed in the 1960s, with the construction of new housing projects and new apartment blocks.

In the 1950s, the area of Torrevecchia began to develop unevenly, and in 1961 it was detached from Suburbio Trionfale and included in the newly established Quartiere Primavalle. Redevelopment interventions of Primavalle and Torrevecchia began in the 1970s, with the construction of new public housing buildings and with the restorations of the old ones.

Over time Primavalle has become more linked to the city center, and is now considered as a semi-peripheral suburb. However, because of the widespread poverty and of the difficult conditions of the population in the past decades, the area is regarded as a petty crime borough. Moreover, during the so-called Anni di Piombo, Primavalle was the location of violent conflicts.

Geography
The territory of Primavalle includes the urban zones 19B Primavalle and 19D Santa Maria della Pietà, as well as portions of the urban zones 18B Val Cannuta and 18C Fogaccia.

Boundaries
To the north, Primavalle borders with Suburbio Della Vittoria (S. XI), whose border is marked by the stretch of Via Trionfale between Via Vincenzo Chiarugi and Via della Pineta Sacchetti.

To the east, the quartiere borders with Quartiere Trionfale (Q. XIV), from which is separated by Via della Pineta Sacchetti. Eastward, Primavalle also borders with Quartiere Aurelio (Q. XIII), whose boundary is marked by Via Domenico Tardini and Largo di Boccea.

Southward, it borders with Suburbio Aurelio (S. IX), from which is separated by Largo di Boccea and Via di Boccea, up to Via di Torrevecchia.

Westward, Primavalle borders with Suburbio Trionfale (S. X), whose boundary is defined by Via di Torrevecchia, Via della Valle dei Fontanili, Via Giuseppe Guicciardi, by the Fosso dei Fontanili up to Via Cesare Lombroso, by Via Cesare Lombroso itself, Via Sebastiano Vinci, Piazza Santa Maria della Pietà and Via Vincenzo Chiarugi.

Odonymy
The majority of the streets and squares of Primavalle is named after religious figures, like popes and cardinals, and after psychiatrists and physicians, revealing the closeness of the borough both to the Vatican City, to the south-east, and to Santa Maria della Pietà, a former mental hospital, to the north. The odonyms of the quartiere can be categorized as follows:
 Actors and operatic singers, e.g. Via Mattia Battistini, Via Gemma Bellincioni, Via Enrico Caruso, Via Edoardo Ferravilla, Via Giulia Grisi, Via Fausta Labia, Via Maria Malibran, Via Claudia Muzio, Via Adelina Patti, Via Titta Ruffo, Via Fanny Tacchinardi;
 Artists related to the St. Peter's Basilica, e.g. Via Pietro Adami, Via Pietro Albertini, Via dei Cristofori, Via Simone Mosca, Via Marcello Provenzale, Via Giambattista Soria;
 Cardinals, e.g. Via Benedetto Aloisi Masella, Via Alessio Ascalesi, Via Pietro Bembo, Via Federico Borromeo, Piazza Alfonso Capecelatro, Via Girolamo Casanate, Via Cardinal Caprara, Via Cardinal Domenico Capranica, Via Cardinal Garampi, Largo Enrico Enríquez, Via Pietro Gasparri, Via Pietro Maffi, Via Prospero Santacroce;
 Educators, e.g. Via Ferrante Aporti, Via Tommaso Pendola, Via Enrico Pestalozzi;
 Popes, e.g. Via Adriano I, Via Alessandro VII, Piazza Clemente XI, Via Eugenio IV, Via Lucio II, Via Pasquale II, Piazza Pio IX, Via San Cleto Papa, Via San Melchiade Papa, Via San Vitaliano, Via Sant'Igino Papa, Via Urbano II;
 Psychiatrists and physicians, e.g. Via Franco Basaglia, Via Ugo Cerletti, Via Vincenzo Chiarugi, Piazza Sante De Sanctis, Via Camillo Golgi, Via Giuseppe Guicciardi, Via Vittorio Marchi, Via Girolamo Mercuriale, Via Enrico Morselli, Via Angelo Mosso, Via Augusto Tamburini, Via Andrea Verga;
 Towns in Liguria, e.g. Via Apricale, Via Beverino, Via Cogoleto, Via Finale Ligure, Largo Millesimo, Via Moneglia, Via Taggia, Via Torriglia, Via Zignago.

Places of interest

Churches
 San Filippo Neri alla Pineta Sacchetti
 Santa Maria della Salute
 Santa Maria Assunta e San Giuseppe a Primavalle
 San Lino
 San Luigi Maria Grignion de Montfort

Parks
 Pineto Regional Park

Education
 Biblioteca Franco Basaglia, the main public library in Primavalle.

See also

Rogo di Primavalle

References